Servo may refer to:

Mechanisms
 Servomechanism, or servo, a device used to provide control of a desired operation through the use of feedback
 AI servo, an autofocus mode
 Electrohydraulic servo valve, an electrically operated valve that controls how hydraulic fluid is ported to an actuator
 Servo drive, a special electronic amplifier used to power electric servomechanisms
 Servomotor, a rotary actuator that allows for precise control of angular position
 Servo (radio control), a small, cheap, mass-produced actuator used for radio control and small robotics
 Servo bandwidth, the maximum trackable sinusoidal frequency of an amplitude
 Servo control, the use of pulse width modulation to remotely control servos
 Servo tab, a small hinged device installed on an aircraft control surface to assist the movement of the control surface

Media

Music
 "Servo", a song by The Brian Jonestown Massacre from the album Give It Back!

Publications
 SERVO Magazine, a monthly robotics publication

Television
 Sam "Servo" Collins, a fictional character from the television series, Superhuman Samurai Syber-Squad
 Tom Servo, a robot from the comedy television series, Mystery Science Theater 3000
 Servo pen, a fictitious multipurpose tool used by Gary Seven in the Star Trek episode "Assignment: Earth"

Video games
 Servo, a non-playable character from the computer game The Sims: Livin' Large
 Servo, a playable character from the expansion pack The Sims 2: Open for Business

People
 Marty Servo (1919–1969), the former world welterweight boxing champion
 Jennifer Servo (1979–2002), a former news reporter

Other uses
 Servo (software), an experimental web browser engine by Mozilla
 Servo Robot Group, a digital vision and sensing system company
 Pasporta Servo, a hospitality service for Esperantists
 Servo, Australian slang for a petrol station, from a contraction of "service station"
 Servotronic, speed-dependent power steering